Kahbijar (also Romanized as Kāhbījār; also known as Kābījār) is a village in Layl Rural District, in the Central District of Lahijan County, Gilan Province, Iran. At the 2006 census, its population was 291, in 104 families.

References 

Populated places in Lahijan County